was a Japanese photographer who specialized in the photography of horses.

Born in Tokyo in 1931, Imai graduated from Bunka Gakuin in 1952. She had her first solo exhibition in 1952; from the 1970s, most of her numerous solo exhibitions were of photographs of horses.

Imai died on 17 February 2009.

Permanent collections
Imai's photographs are represented in the permanent collections of:
 the Tokyo Metropolitan Museum of Photography, 
 Nihon University, 
 the Museum of Modern Art, New York City, 
 the BnF (Paris), 
 the Museum für Kunst und Gewerbe Hamburg, 
 the Yamaguchi Prefectural Museum of Art, 
 the Kawasaki City Museum and 
 the Kiyosato Museum of Photographic Arts.

Notes

1931 births
2009 deaths
Japanese photographers
Japanese women photographers
People from Tokyo